Bell Mountain may refer to:

Mountains
Bell Mountain (Riverside County, California)
Bell Mountain (San Bernardino County, California)
Bell Mountain (Idaho)
Bell Mountain (Missouri)
Bell Mountain (Nevada)
Bell Mountain (New York)

Other uses
Bell Mountain, California, a community in San Bernardino County
Bell Mountain Wilderness, a wilderness area in Missouri
Bell Mountain AVA, a viticultural area in Gillespie County, Texas